Calyx is a British drum and bass act, specialising in the techstep style.  Previously the duo of Larry Cons and Chris Rush (both of London), it is now a solo project of Larry Cons.

Their first release was in 1998 for Moving Shadow sublabel Audio Couture.  Most of their releases have been for Moving Shadow, including their debut album No Turning Back (2005), with a few appearances for Metalheadz and Renegade Hardware. Many of Calyx hits has been featured in the video game Midnight Club 3. Track Quagmire is featured in Grand Theft Auto III.

In September 2007 he released an album called Anatomy, which was a joint project with fellow drum 'n' bass artist and long-term collaborator Teebee. Calyx and Teebee went on to release a second collaborative album All or Nothing in November 2012 under Ram Records (UK).

He is reportedly working with Phace on new tracks.

Music career
London-based jungle/drum 'n' bass production team Calyx began as guitarist Larry Cons, who previously led a jazz-funk band called Octane, and former drummer Chris Rush. The two met at Oxford Brookes University before starting work together and launching their own recording studio in Streatham, South London.

Calyx debuted in February 1998 with "Cubic" / "Narcosis" released on Moving Shadow's sister label Audio Couture.

In 2000, after releasing the Catapult EP, Chris Rush decided to leave the duo to pursue a non-musical career, and since then Larry Cons continued Calyx as a solo project. Since that time Larry has released a number of tracks, including the Downpour EP, his debut on Metalheadz "Leviathan" / "Mindfold" and another EP for Moving Shadow, the Wasteground EP. He collaborated with Dom & Roland on the release "Pneumatix (Sledgehammer)" / "See The Light" He released his debut album No Turning Back on Moving Shadow.

Discography
Calyx – No Turning Back (2005)
Illusions (5:56)
Follow The Leader (feat. Teebee) (6:24)
Are You Ready? (Hive and Gridlok Remix) (5:30)
Dead Ringer (feat. Gridlok) (6:52)
Killa (Dom & Roland Remix) (6:53)
Tearing Us Apart (6:02)
Thru Your Eyes (feat. Ill.Skillz) (6:42)
Cyclone (feat. Teebee) (5:36)
Chasing Shadows (5:36)
Get Myself To You (7:32)

Calyx & Teebee – Anatomy (2007)
The Divide (6:05)
Dual Processed (feat. MC Verse) (5:22)
Make Your Choice (5:21)
All That Remains (5:50)
Warrior (6:05)
Ultimatum (5:22)
Telepathy (6:06)
Enygma (7:06)
Confession (5:39)
Vortex (5:36)

Calyx & Teebee – All or Nothing (2012)
Heroes & Villains (5:37)
Pure Gold (feat. Kemo) (5:34)
Skank (4:38)
We Become One (feat. Craze and Foreign Beggars) (5:03)
Elevate This Sound (5:20)
We Fall Away (4:30)
Scavenger (5:07)
Strung Out (3:29)
You'll Never Take Me Alive (feat. Beardyman) (4:16)
Starstruck (5:00)
Back & Forth (4:41)
Nothing I Can Say (5:26)

Calyx & TeeBee – FabricLive.76 (2014)

Calyx & Teebee – 1x1 (2016)
Nothing Left	(4:57)
Long Gone (3:55)
Big Tune Again (4:49)
Cloud 9 (4:39)
False Alarm (3:48)
Ghetto Feat. Doctor (3:49)
Pathfinder (7:09)
Ghostwriter (4:20)
Takes One To Know One (3:38)
Were We Go Feat. Doctor (4:22)
The Fall Feat. Ayah Marar (4:28)
Panic Attack (4:54)
Stray Bullet (5:14)
A Day That Never Comes (4:09)

Song usage
Tracks "Follow the Leader", "Thru Your Eyes", "Get Myself to You", "Chasing Shadows", "Illusions", "Collision Course" and "Are You Ready" are used in the popular racing game, Midnight Club 3: DUB Edition.

"Quagmire" is featured in Grand Theft Auto III

References

External links

 MySpace
 https://web.archive.org/web/20091217011011/http://www.dogsonacid.com/showthread.php?threadid=297977&mode=article

English drum and bass musicians
English record producers
English electronic music duos
RAM Records artists
British drum and bass music groups
Drum and bass duos